Rostanga crawfordi is a species of sea slug, a  dorid nudibranch, a marine gastropod mollusc in the family Discodorididae. Originally described as Discodoris crawfordi, it was redescribed by Rudman & Avern as Rostanga australis. The two names were synonymised by Dayrat.

Distribution
This species was described from Port Phillip, Victoria, Australia. It is known only from Victoria, South Australia and Western Australia, Australia.

Description
This dorid nudibranch is pale orange-yellow to orange-pink in colour; the dorsum is covered with caryophyllidia.

Ecology
Rostanga crawfordi is found on the red sponge, Psammoclema, on which it presumably feeds. This sponge genus is currently classified in the family Chondropsidae. Most other species of Rostanga feed on sponges of the family Microcionidae.

References

Discodorididae
Gastropods described in 1969